Steven John Peter Spears (22 January 1951 – 16 October 2007) was an Australian playwright, actor, writer and singer. His most famous work was The Elocution of Benjamin Franklin (1976).  He was cited as "one of Australia's most celebrated playwrights".

Biography

Early life
Spears was born in Adelaide, South Australia in 1951 and, after his parents separated when he was very young, grew up with relatives in the suburb of Mile End.
He studied law at the University of Adelaide, but through writing and performing student revues, was distracted into a career in the theatre.

Sydney
Spears moved to Sydney in the 1970s.  In his own words, he was a "born-again Sydney-sider".

Later life
Spears died in Aldinga, South Australia, from brain cancer in 2007. He was 56.

Plays
Spears' theatrical works include:
 Africa: A Savage Musical (1974)
 People Keep Giving Me Things (1975)
 Roaring Boy (1975)
 There Were Giants in Those Days (1975)
 Young Mo (full title "The Resuscitation of the Little Prince Who Couldn't Laugh as Performed by Young Mo at the Height of the Great Depression of 1929") (1975), about the Australian comedian Roy "Mo" Rene
 The Elocution of Benjamin Franklin (1976), closely identified with the career of the actor Gordon Chater.
 When They Send Me Three and Fourpence (1976)
 The Death of George Reeves (1978)
 King Richard (1978)
 The Time of the Bodgie (1980)
 Froggie (1983)
 Glory (1988)
 Namatjira Park (1992)
 A Little Theatre (1995)

His final theatre work was The Dance Angelic (1995).

Acting work

Television
Spears appeared in A Country Practice (1981), Hey Dad! (1988), G.P. (1989),  Heartbreak High (2004).

Film
Among other roles, Spears played the lead in Temperament Unsuited and "The Mechanic", a wheelchair-using paraplegic, in Mad Max 2.

Voice work
Spears also supplied the voice of Lion in the popular children's TV series Magic Mountain for ABC TV, Southern Star Entertainment and China Central Television.

Stage
Spears played "Eddie" and "Doctor Scott" in a 1981 Sydney production of Jim Sharman's The Rocky Horror Show.

Writing
Over his career, Spears wrote prolifically for television. His credits include:
episodes of:
A Country Practice
Hey Dad..!
All Together Now
Neighbours
E Street
G.P.
Heartbreak High
the children's series The Genie From Down Under (including the first episode Wishing and Hoping) for the Australian Children's Television Foundation, ABC and BBC.
the children's animated series The Greatest Tune on Earth for the Australian Children's Television Foundation and Seven Network.
the children's animated series Fairy Tale Police Department for Yoram Gross-EM.TV and Seven Network.
the children's animated series Gloria's House for Energee and Seven Network.
the children's series Sky Trackers for the Australian Children's Television Foundation and Seven Network.
The Big Wish for the Australian Children's Television Foundation.
which, with co-writer John Hepworth was published by Puffin (1990)  
 
Spears wrote an "anti-memoir" "In Search of the Bodgie", published in 1989

In 2004, Spears' detective novel Murder at the Fortnight was published. It was planned as the first of a thirteen part series, The Pentangeli Papers, but only one more, Innocent Murders (2006) was published before his death.

Partial filmography
Temperament Unsuited (1979) - Mark
Mad Max 2 (1981) - Mechanic
Going Down (1983) - Trendy at party
The Empty Beach (1985) - Manny
Those Dear Departed (1987) - Dangerman
Warm Nights on a Slow Moving Train (1988) - Singer
Afraid to Dance (1989) - Garage Man

References

External links

 Penelope Debelle, Obituary, The Age, 22 October 2007, p. 11
 Picture of Spears in his University of Adelaide years

1951 births
2007 deaths
Australian male film actors
Australian male television actors
Australian male voice actors
Australian male dramatists and playwrights
Australian television writers
Australian male television writers
Deaths from lung cancer
People from Adelaide
Deaths from cancer in South Australia
20th-century Australian dramatists and playwrights
20th-century Australian male writers
20th-century Australian screenwriters